The Van's RV-4 is an American light homebuilt aircraft supplied in kit form by Van's Aircraft of Aurora, Oregon. It seats two people in a tandem seating configuration with the pilot accommodated in the front seat.

The Van's RV series has become the most popular kit-built aircraft in the world. , the RV-4 is the fourth most popular RV model.

As of November 2022, 1446 RV-4s had been completed and flown worldwide.

Development
 

Richard VanGrunsven designed the RV-4 in the mid 1970s as a two-seat development of the single-seat RV-3. The RV-4 prototype first flew in August 1979.

The RV-4 is a new design based upon the concepts proven in the RV-3 and is not merely a stretched RV-3. The RV-4 has a new wing, with increased wingspan and wing area over the RV-3. The RV-4 is designed for sport aerobatics.

The RV-4 has proven to be a capable cross country aircraft in service, able to carry two modest sized people and baggage on longer trips. RV-4s have been flown around the world, notably by an Australian, Jon Johanson, who completed world-girdling RV-4 flights on two occasions.

Many larger people find the RV-4 cockpit design physically constraining, and as a result VanGrunsven has designed an entire family of derivative designs. The RV-6 was designed to allow side-by-side seating, and the RV-8 was created as an enlarged aircraft that follows the RV-4's philosophy and offers tandem seating in a bigger aircraft.

Unlike most later RV series designs, RV-4 kits are only available with conventional landing gear, although some may have been constructed in tricycle configuration by builders. At least two RV-4s have also been built with retractable landing gear (mostly for the engineering challenge, as the performance gains were modest).

Variants
RV-4
Basic version
Harmon Rocket
Higher performance derivative of the RV4, with clipped wings, a  Lycoming IO-540 engine and a razorback turtledeck.

Specifications (Typical RV-4)

See also

References

External links

Homebuilt aircraft
1970s United States civil utility aircraft
RV-04
Single-engined tractor aircraft
Low-wing aircraft
Aircraft first flown in 1979